Kirk's Work (also reissued as Funk Underneath) is an album by Roland Kirk with Jack McDuff. Prestige Records released the album in 1961, with Original Jazz Classics and Concord Music Group issuing subsequent re-releases.

Rudy Van Gelder engineered the recording on July 11, 1961 at Van Gelder Studio in Englewood Cliffs, New Jersey.  Esmond Edwards supervised the session.  Van Gelder remastered the recording for the Concord 2007 re-release.

Critical reception

The Penguin Guide to Jazz Recordings describes Kirk's Work as "a largely forgotten Kirk album, but one which generally deserves the classic reissue billing."  Ron Wynn has described the album as "a fine reissue of Kirk in a soul-jazz and mainstream vein."  AllMusic notes a "swinging R&B vibe pervasive throughout the album," judging that "while certainly not the best in his catalog, it is a touchstone album that captures the early soulful Rahsaan Roland Kirk."

Track listing

Personnel
 Roland Kirk – tenor saxophone, manzello, stritch , flute, siren
 Jack McDuff – Hammond organ
 Joe Benjamin – bass
 Arthur Taylor – drums

References

Rahsaan Roland Kirk albums
1961 albums
Prestige Records albums
Albums recorded at Van Gelder Studio
Albums produced by Esmond Edwards
Jack McDuff albums